Trinickel boride is a compound of nickel and boron with chemical formula .  It is one of the borides of nickel.

The compound was described in 1959 by R. Fruchart, S. Rundquist, and L. H. Anderson and R. Kiessling.  It is a hard solid with the cementite crystal structure.

Synthesis
Trinickel boride can be obtained, as grains embedded in a nickel matrix, by heating  Brown's P-1 and P-2 "nickel boride"catalyst to 250 °C.  This catalyst is produced by reduction of nickel salts with sodium borohydride.

Trinickel boride can be obtained also by compressing nickel and boron powders with explosives.

Recently it has been found that  can be formed (together with other nickel borides) by heating sodium borohydride with powdered  nickel metal to 670 °C in a closed vessel, so that the released hydrogen creates a pressure of up to 3.4 MPa. The main reactions can be summarized as 
 2 ↔ 2NaH + 
 3Ni + 2 + NaH ↔  + 3 + 2 + Na
but other reactions occur, yielding other borides.

See also
 Dinickel boride

References

Borides
Nickel compounds